Adam J. Achter (born August 27, 1988) is an American college baseball coach and former professional baseball pitcher. He was most recently the pitching coach at Eastern Michigan University. Achter played college baseball at Michigan State University. He played in Major League Baseball (MLB) for the Minnesota Twins and Los Angeles Angels.

High school
Achter attended Clay High School in Oregon, Ohio, where he starred for the school's baseball and basketball teams. In his senior year, 2007, Achter had a 7–1 win–loss record with a 0.92 earned run average (ERA) and 102 strikeouts, as well as batting .429 and leading his team to their second straight district championship. He threw a no-hitter against Findlay High School, and was named Toledo City League Player of the Year, tournament MVP, first team All-Toledo City League, and first team All-Ohio. Achter was also named Clay's 2007 Male Scholar-Athlete of the Year.

Achter came out of high school rated as the No. 5 high school prospect in Ohio by Baseball America. After not being selected during the 2007 Major League Baseball draft, he enrolled in Michigan State University.

College
Achter made his debut with the Michigan State Spartans in 2008 when he made eight starts and three relief appearances. Over 33.2 innings, Achter went 1–3 and had just a .224 batting average against. On May 4, A.J. made perhaps his best start of the year when he held the Penn State Nittany Lions to one hit over 7.1 innings pitched.

In his sophomore season, Achter tied for the team lead in starts with 14, going 3–6 with 57 strikeouts over 81.1 innings. A.J. allowed only four home runs and 34 earned runs, leading to an ERA of 3.76, second-lowest in the starting rotation. In 2010, he played collegiate summer baseball with the Cotuit Kettleers of the Cape Cod Baseball League and was named a league all-star.

Professional career

Minnesota Twins
Achter was selected in the 46th round of the 2010 Major League Baseball Draft by the Minnesota Twins, but with two years of eligibility remaining at Michigan State and with no signing bonus offered by the Twins, A.J. had no reason to leave college. During the summer, Achter pitched a "lights-out" summer in the Cape Cod League, and two hours before the August signing deadline, the Twins gave Achter a $50,000 bonus to sign, which he accepted.

Achter began his career with the Elizabethton Twins of the Appalachian League, going 0–1 with a 4.91 ERA over 7.1 innings pitched. In 2011, Achter spent the season with the Beloit Snappers of the Midwest League. In his first full professional season, A.J. started 19 games, going 5–8 with a 4.52 ERA.

Achter began the 2012 season with the Snappers, this time as a reliever, and quickly found his niche, going 3–1 with a 2.48 ERA over 40 innings. Achter's success earned the pitcher a mid-June promotion to the High-A Fort Myers Miracle of the Florida State League as well as an All-Star selection in the Midwest League. A.J. pitched another 34.1 innings while allowing three earned runs, leading to a sparkling 0.79 ERA to go along with 37 strikeouts and a 2–1 record.

As a result of his success the year before, Achter started 2013 with the AA New Britain Rock Cats of the Eastern League, carrying a 2–0 record, 2.21 ERA, and 36 strikeouts over 36.2 innings of work. He was named to appear in the Eastern League All-Star Game. Achter was promoted to the AAA Rochester Red Wings of the International League. While in Rochester, Achter went 1–2 with a 3.04 ERA, .198 batting average against, and 20 strikeouts over 23.2 innings, helping the Red Wings to their first playoff appearance since 2006.  He was assigned to the Arizona Fall League after the season.

In 2014, Achter began the year at AA with the New Britain Rock Cats but did not remain there for long; after 6.2 scoreless innings in which Achter allowed three hits, one walk, and struck out 11, he was promoted to the AAA Rochester Red Wings where he was the only Red Wings' player selected to the 2014 AAA All-Star Game. On September 1 his contract was selected by the Twins and he was called up the Majors for the first time in his career. Two days later he made his Major League debut against the Chicago White Sox, pitching one inning in relief and not allowing a run.

Los Angeles Angels
After the 2015 season, the Philadelphia Phillies claimed Achter off of waivers. They designated him for assignment on December 11. On December 17, 2015, Achter was claimed off of waivers by the Los Angeles Angels. He began the season with the AAA Salt Lake Bees. The Angels selected his contract on August 9, 2016. During the 2016 season, Achter posted a 3.11 ERA and 1.46 WHIP in 27 games with the Los Angeles Angels.

Detroit Tigers
On December 9, 2016, the Detroit Tigers signed Achter to a minor league contract, and was invited to spring training. He was released on June 6, 2017.

Somerset Patriots
On June 28, 2017, Achter signed with the Somerset Patriots of the Atlantic League of Professional Baseball. He announced his retirement on January 8, 2018.

Coaching career
On January 8, 2018, Achter was named the pitching coach at Eastern Michigan University.

Personal life
Achter has two siblings, Amanda and Austin.  Austin is younger and played baseball and graduated from Ohio State University. His parents are Rod and Cindy. Rod was a wide receiver at the University of Toledo and eventually was drafted by the Minnesota Vikings. A.J. is married to fellow Michigan State Spartan alumnus, Kaiti Nester. They have a purebred Shih Tzu, Izzy Nester-Achter. Izzy is named after Tom Izzo. A.J. and Kaiti live in Brighton, Michigan.

References

External links

1988 births
Living people
Baseball players from Ohio
Sportspeople from Toledo, Ohio
Major League Baseball pitchers
Minnesota Twins players
Los Angeles Angels players
Michigan State Spartans baseball players
Cotuit Kettleers players
Elizabethton Twins players
Beloit Snappers players
Fort Myers Miracle players
New Britain Rock Cats players
Glendale Desert Dogs players
Rochester Red Wings players
Salt Lake Bees players
Somerset Patriots players
Erie SeaWolves players
Eastern Michigan Eagles baseball coaches
People from Oregon, Ohio